Six Cents and Natalie is the sporadic side-project of Tullycraft lead singer Sean Tollefson. This lo-fi band actually predates Tollefson's pre-Tullycraft band Crayon. Six Cents and Natalie released a series of cassette tapes and 7-inch singles in the mid 1990s. Eventually, two full-length CDs were released by Black Bean & Placenta Tape Club that compiled most of the material found on the early cassettes and singles.

Discography

Cassettes
 Water Machine (cassette) self-released (1992)
 Tressel (cassette) self-released (1993)
 Let's Pretend We're Married (cassette) self-released (1993)

Singles and EPs
 Boyfriends (7-inch) Harriet Records (1993)
 Learning To Share EP (split 7-inch)  Sudden Shame Records (1994)
 Summer's Gone But A Lot Goes On (7-inch) Burden of Joy Records (1994)
 When Punk Fell To Earth (7-inch ) Rubber Goldfish Records (1995)
 Six Cents & Natalie / Phlegm (split 7-inch)  Black Bean & Placenta Tape Club (1997)

Albums
 Show Me The Honey (CD)  Black Bean & Placenta Tape Club (1999)
 When Punk Fell To Earth (CD) Black Bean & Placenta Tape Club (2001)

Compilations
Fluttered - compilation (cassette) "Fire Walk With Me" Big Jim Records, (1995)
Jet-Age Circuit Rider - compilation (cassette) "Untitled" Slabco, (1995)
The Long Secret - compilation (CD) "Quilting Bee" Harriet Records, (1995)
Cosmic Slop - compilation (cassette) "Just One" Paperplane, (1995)
La Blackbean Taqueria - compilation (LP) "Easter Sunday" Blackbean And Placenta Tape Club, (1995)
Childhood Friends - compilation (cassette) "You And Me" Brassland, (1995)
Extended Vacation - compilation (cassette) "Jake Ryan" Krebstar Records, (1996)
Chutes & Ladders - compilation (cassette) "The Sadness Of Science" Cactus Gum Recordings, (1996)
Whiskey, You're The Devil - compilation (CD) "Showgirls" Cactus Gum Recordings, (1996)
Wish I Was... - compilation (cassette) "Shelly" Lil' Red Wagon, (1996)
As Seen On TV - compilation (CD) "My Date With Rachel Sweet" Spare Me Records, (1996)
Pop Machine - compilation (cassette) "Tag" Cowly Owl !, (1997)
The Storm Of The Century - compilation (CD) "My Date With Rachel Sweet" Sudden Shame, (1997)
Never Kept A Diary - compilation (CD) "Baywatch Nights" Motorcoat Records, (1998)
The Sidewalk Chalk Adventure - compilation (7-inch) "You Could Be The One" Kittridge Records, (1999)
Kindercore Christmas Two - compilation (CD) "Secret Santa" Kindercore Records, (1999)
Build Your Own Radio - compilation (CD) "Bessy" Bumblebear Records, (2000)
Sweet Sweet Casio - compilation (CD) "Devil In Your Heart" North Of January, (2001)
The Way Things Change Volume 4 - compilation (CD) "Christine, North Dakota" Red Square, (2002)

References 

 Strong, M. C. (2003). The Great Indie Discography (2nd Edition) pg. 1041. Published by Canon Books Ltd. (US/CAN) .
 Discogs . When Punk Fell To Earth. Retrieved on November 14, 2008.

External links
 Official Site
 Tullycraft at TweeNet

Indie pop groups from Washington (state)